David Conner may refer to:

People
 David Conner (bishop) (born 1947), Dean of Windsor and Bishop to the Armed Forces
 David Conner (naval officer) (1792–1856), officer of the United States Navy
 David Philbrick Conner, CEO of Oversea-Chinese Banking Corporation
 David Michael Conner (born 1978), American writer

Fictional characters
 Dr. David Conner, Alter ego of the Eradicator (comics), a DC comics character

See also
 David Connor (disambiguation)